Sixto Ylagan Orosa Sr. (August 6, 1891 – April 21, 1981) was a Filipino physician and writer.

Background 
Orosa was born in Taal. He was the brother of María Orosa.

Books 
Books written by Orosa, includes:
The Sulu Archipelago and Its People, World Book Company, 1931
Through Three Generations, 1976
Jose Rizal: Man and Hero, 
Si Jose Rizal: ang pambansang bayaning Pilipino, S.Y. Orosa, 1958

References 

1891 births
1981 deaths
People from Taal, Batangas
20th-century Filipino medical doctors